The Dark Roses is a Danish graffiti crew from Copenhagen. Founded New Year's Eve 1984, by two crew members of 'The New Nation', Cobra and Doggie. The Dark Roses became one of the pioneers of Scandinavian graffiti. Since the beginning, many graffiti writers have been participating with the Roses, such as ... Seeny, Pirat, Crazy Cat, Stich, Cobra, Leece, Snaky, Jeen, Rodrigo, Case D., Mini, Gooser, Pearl, Aim, Freez (Sweden), Dwane (Sweden), Sonic, Dozo, Sece, Fuse, Avelon and Doggie.

The Dark Roses still exists. Many of the members no longer make graffiti, but fx in January 2007 NetBiennial was founded by The Dark Roses. A free non-profit 'graffiti' internet biennale for html/xhtml artists.

Selected Literature
1985 Dansk Wildstyle Graffiti af Peter Skaarup, Libero

External links
The Dark Roses entry

Danish painters
Danish graffiti artists